Earthbound is a live album by the band King Crimson, released in 1972 as a budget record shortly after the line-up that recorded it had broken up. It contains the band's first official live release of their signature song "21st Century Schizoid Man", and an extended live version of their 1970 non-LP B-side "Groon". It also contains two improvised tracks with scat vocals from Boz Burrell.

The album's sound quality is relatively poor, because of being recorded onto cassette tape (a low-fidelity recording medium, even by 1972 standards) by live sound engineer Hunter MacDonald. The liner notes to the original LP cover and recent CD reissues of the album state that it was "captured live on an Ampex stereo cassette fed from a Kelsey Morris custom built mixer ... in the rain from the back of a Volkswagen truck." Atlantic Records, the original distributor for King Crimson in the United States and Canada, declined to release Earthbound because of its poor sound. Because of the origins of the masters, the sound could not be significantly improved on later CD reissues of the album.

An expanded CD-DVD version of the album was released on 13 November 2017. The CD is expanded to twelve tracks, whereas the DVD features hi-res audio of the album along with much additional audio material including a live radio session in surround sound.

Track listing

Personnel

King Crimson
 Robert Fripp – electric guitar
 Boz Burrell – bass guitar, vocals
 Mel Collins – alto, tenor and baritone saxophone, mellotron
 Ian Wallace – drums

Additional personnel
 Hunter MacDonald – VCS3 synthesizer, recording engineer

References

External links
 List of fan reviews
 Julian Cope presents Head Heritage | Unsung | The Book of Seth | King Crimson - Earthbound

Albums produced by Robert Fripp
1972 live albums
King Crimson live albums
E.G. Records live albums
Island Records live albums
Polydor Records live albums
Virgin Records live albums